Emmanouil Manousogiannakis (1853 – 24 July 1916) was a senior Hellenic Army officer who distinguished himself in the Balkan Wars of 1912–1913.

He was born in the region of Sfakia in Crete (then still part of the Ottoman Empire) in 1853. He studied at the Hellenic Military Academy and was commissioned into the Army as an Ensign of the Artillery. During the Greco-Turkish War of 1897, he participated in the Greek expeditionary corps to his native Crete under Colonel Timoleon Vassos.

In 1909, with the rank of Colonel, he served as Minister of Military Affairs in the short-lived cabinet of Dimitrios Rallis, which was toppled by the Goudi coup. In early 1911 Manousogiannakis was placed as commander of the 1st Infantry Division at Larissa. His division's performance during the great spring manoeuvres of 1912 earned him a promotion to Major General. Manousogiannakis led the 1st Division during both Balkan Wars, and distinguished himself especially during the Second Balkan War against Bulgaria in the battles of Lachanas and Kresna.

After the war, he was promoted to Lieutenant General and placed in command of the newly established II Army Corps at Patras. There he died on 24 July 1916.

References 

1853 births
1916 deaths
Hellenic Army lieutenant generals
Greek military personnel of the Balkan Wars
People from Sfakia
Ministers of Military Affairs of Greece
Military personnel from Crete